Angelo Orlando (born 11 August 1965) is an Italian professional football coach and a former midfielder. He is currently an assistant director for FA Euro in New York.

Playing career
Orlando began his career in 1983 with Varese, where he remained for two seasons, before moving to Triestina in 1985. In 1988, he was transferred to Udinese, where he remained until he was acquired by Inter in 1991, later winning an UEFA Cup in 1994. In 1995, he moved to Cremonese  for two seasons, before ending his career with Juve Stabia during the 1997–98 season.

Managerial career
After retiring, he pursued a career as a coach, initially leading the Triestina Youth team, and later becoming an assistant manager for Latvian side FK Ventspils, alongside Carmine Balleri, where he managed a second-place finish in the top domestic league division.

Honours

Player
Inter
UEFA Cup: 1993–94

References

1965 births
Living people
People from San Cataldo, Sicily
Footballers from Sicily
Italian footballers
Association football midfielders
Serie A players
Serie B players
S.S.D. Varese Calcio players
U.S. Triestina Calcio 1918 players
Udinese Calcio players
Inter Milan players
U.S. Cremonese players
S.S. Juve Stabia players
Italian expatriates in Latvia
UEFA Cup winning players
Sportspeople from the Province of Caltanissetta